Enhancer of polycomb homolog 2 (Drosophila) is a protein that in humans is encoded by the EPC2 gene.

References

Further reading